The caber toss is a traditional Scottish athletic event in which competitors toss a large tapered pole called a "caber" (/ˈkeɪbər/). It is normally practised at the Scottish Highland Games. The term "caber" derives from the Gaelic word cabar, which refers to a wooden beam.

The person tossing the caber is called a "tosser" or a "thrower".

It is said to have developed from the need to toss logs across narrow chasms (in order to cross them), lumberjacks needing to transport logs by throwing them in streams, or by lumberjacks challenging each other to a small contest. Although the sport is primarily associated with Scotland, a similar exercise, "casting the bar", was popular in England in the 16th century, and similar sports exist around the world, such as stångstörtning in Sweden.

The record for most caber tosses in three minutes is currently held by the Canadian Danny Frame. He managed to perform 16 successful caber tosses on 20 July 2018 at the Heart of the Valley Festival in Middleton, Nova Scotia, Canada.

Objective and technique
The primary objective is to toss the caber so that it turns end over end, falling away from the tosser. Ideally it should fall directly away from the tosser in the "12 o'clock" position. The distance thrown is unimportant.

The tosser balances the caber upright, tapered end downwards, against his or her shoulder and neck, the caber being supported by stewards or fellow-competitors while being placed into position.  The tosser then crouches, sliding their interlocked hands down the caber and under the rounded base, and lifts it in their cupped hands. 
The tosser must balance the caber upright; this is not easy with the heavier end at the top, and less-experienced tossers may be unable to stop the caber falling to one side after lifting it. The tosser then walks or runs a few paces forward to gain momentum, and flips the tapered end upwards so that the large end hits the ground first, and, if well tossed, the caber falls directly away from the tosser.

Weight and strength are essential for success, but technique is also important for balancing the caber when lifting it, and flipping up the held (tapered) end to promote a clean toss.

Scoring

The straightest end-over-end toss scores highest.  If the caber lands on its end but falls back towards the thrower, the score is lower than for any end-over-end throw but is based upon the maximum vertical angle that the caber achieved (side-judging may involve a second judge).

End-over-end tosses are scored according to the hours on a clock, with a 12:00 score being highest (falling directly away from the thrower), down to a 9 or 3 for cabers that reach a vertical, before falling to the side.

Photo gallery

See also

 Stone put
 Scottish hammer throw
 Weight throw
 Weight over the bar
 Sheaf toss
 Woodsman#Pulpwood toss

References

Highland games
Individual sports
Throwing sports
Lumberjack sports
Sports originating in Scotland
Strength sports